Fourth Council of Constantinople (also Eighth Ecumenical Council) may refer to:
 Fourth Council of Constantinople (Roman Catholic) that took place in 869–870
 Fourth Council of Constantinople (Eastern Orthodox) that took place in 879–880

bg:Четвърти Константинополски събор
it:Concilio di Costantinopoli VI
la:Concilium Constantinopolitanum Quartum
pl:Sobór Konstantynopolitański IV
ru:Четвёртый Константинопольский собор